Coventry Township is one of the nine townships of Summit County, Ohio, United States.  The 2000 census found 10,900 people in the township.

Geography
Coventry Township is located in southern Summit County.  At its creation, it bordered the following townships:
Portage Township - north
Springfield Township - east
Green Township - southeast
Franklin Township - southwest
Norton Township - west
However, due to annexations, it currently borders the following township and cities:
Akron - north
Springfield Township - east
Green - southeast
New Franklin - southwest
Barberton - west

Several populated places are located in the original bounds of Coventry Township:
Part of the city of Akron, the county seat of Summit County, in the north
Part of the city of Barberton, in the west
The census-designated place of Portage Lakes, in the center

Name and history
It is the only Coventry Township statewide.

Coventry Township is part of the Connecticut Western Reserve in Township 1N, Range 11W.

Government
The township is governed by a three-member board of trustees, who are elected in November of odd-numbered years to a four-year term beginning on the following January 1. Two are elected in the year after the presidential election and one is elected in the year before it. There is also an elected township fiscal officer, who serves a four-year term beginning on April 1 of the year after the election, which is held in November of the year before the presidential election. Vacancies in the fiscal officership or on the board of trustees are filled by the remaining trustees.

Transportation and public services
Interstate 77 runs north-to-south throughout the township, and has three exits serving the township.  Interstate 277/U.S. Route 224 has its interchanges with Interstate 77 completely within the township, although most of the highway is actually inside Akron city limits.  Both Interstate 77 and Interstate 277/US 224 are six-lane freeways.  Manchester Rd./SR 93 is the main road throughout the township, where it is four-lane road to enter the township, until its intersection with Cormany Rd.  From there, it gradually narrows from a two-lane road with a left turn lane to a two-lane road.  Turkeyfoot Lake Rd./SR 619 runs through the extreme western portion of the township, connecting New Franklin and Barberton.  It is a two-lane road.  Summit County manages the other major roads, which include South Main Street, and South Arlington, Cormany, Killian, and Warner Roads, and Portage Lakes Drive.

Coventry Township is in the 330 and 234 area codes.  Manchester Rd/SR 93 is the de facto boundary line between the township's main zip code, 44319, and Barberton's zip code, 44203.  The extreme northeastern corner of the township has the zip code 44306.

References

External links
Township website
County website

Townships in Summit County, Ohio
Townships in Ohio